Resuloğlu is a village in the Uğurludağ District of Çorum Province in Turkey. Its population is 18 (2022). The village is populated by Kurds.

References

Villages in Uğurludağ District
Kurdish settlements in Çorum Province